Pool C of the 2019 Rugby World Cup began on 21 September 2019. The pool included previous World Cup hosts England and France, as well as the fourth-placed team from 2015, Argentina. They were joined by regional qualifiers from the Americas, United States (Americas 1), and Oceania, Tonga (Oceania 2), to become the first completed table ahead of the World Cup.

England and France both went unbeaten in their first three matches to guarantee qualification for the knockout stage, but their final match against each other was cancelled due to the effects of Typhoon Hagibis. England had earned a bonus point in all three of their matches, while France had just one, so England went through to the quarter-finals as pool winners. With bonus point victories against Tonga and the United States, Argentina claimed third place and the final automatic qualification spot for the 2023 Rugby World Cup, while Tonga's win over the United States in the final pool match saw them finish fourth.

Overview
Pool C's opening match saw Argentina come back from a 17-point half-time deficit against France at Tokyo Stadium, only for France's Camille Lopez to score a game-winning drop goal in the 70th minute. In Sapporo, two tries from Manu Tuilagi helped England to a bonus-point victory over Tonga. England followed that up with a 38-point victory over the United States, with Joe Cokanasiga scoring two tries in the victory; however, the match was soured by the first red card of the tournament, shown to the United States' John Quill for a shoulder charge to the head of England's Owen Farrell. Argentina bounced back from their defeat by France with a 28–12 victory over Tonga in Higashiōsaka; all of Argentina's scoring happened in the first 28 minutes, including a hat-trick from Julián Montoya as they raced to a 28-point lead before Tonga brought the margin back to 16 with two tries of their own. After Typhoon Mitag almost cancelled the match, the French were inconsistent with errors keeping the United States in the match before three late tries in the second half would secure a 33–9 win in Fukuoka.

In Chōfu, England qualified for the quarter-finals with a 39–10 victory over Argentina with Argentinean player Tomás Lavanini being shown a red card, which forced Argentina down to 14 men as he was forced off due to a high tackle on Owen Farrell's head. France would later join them in qualifying for the knockout stage with a two-point victory over Tonga at Kumamoto Stadium. After conceding the first 17 points of the match, Tonga came back into the match with tries from Sonatane Takulua and Mali Hingano to close the gap to only three points before Romain Ntamack gave the cushion that France needed with two penalties in eight minutes giving France the victory. Argentina would become the first team to finish their matches of the 2019 World Cup, with a 47–17 victory over the United States in Kumagaya. Joaquín Tuculet and Juan Cruz Mallia each scored two tries in the meeting, their first since 2003. After the England–France game was cancelled due to Typhoon Hagibis, Tonga ended their World Cup campaign with a 31–19 victory over the United States. This was due to the Tongan's using their opportunities with them converting into tries and despite the United States being within striking range with three minutes to go, Telusa Veainu converted the match-winning try and a bonus-point victory for Tonga. At the end of the pool stage, it was England winning the group with France finishing in second place.

Standings

All times are local Japan Standard Time (UTC+09)

France vs Argentina

Notes:
Guido Petti (Argentina) earned his 50th test cap.

England vs Tonga

England vs United States

Argentina vs Tonga

Notes:
Agustín Creevy levelled Argentina's most capped player record, set by Felipe Contepomi with 87 caps.

France vs United States

Notes:
Gaël Fickou (France) earned his 50th test cap.

England vs Argentina

Notes:
Agustín Creevy became the most capped player for Argentina with 88 caps, surpassing Felipe Contepomi's record of 87.
Tomás Lavanini's red card was a record fifth for a World Cup, surpassing the four given out in 1995 and 1999.
With this loss for Argentina and France's win on the 6 October, Argentina fail to advance through to the knock-out stage of the World Cup for the first time since 2003.
Angus Gardner was due to be part of the officiating team for this game, but swapped with Ben O'Keeffe's appointment between Japan and Samoa.

France vs Tonga

Notes:
Pierre-Louis Barassi (France) made his international debut.

Argentina vs United States

Notes:
Cam Dolan (United States) earned his 50th test cap.

England vs France

Notes:
As a result of inclement weather caused by Typhoon Hagibis this match was cancelled and awarded as a 0–0 draw.

United States vs Tonga

References

Pool B
2019–20 in English rugby union
2019–20 in French rugby union
2019 in Argentine rugby union
2019 in American rugby union
2019 in Tongan rugby union